Daddy Cool Munde Fool (English: Daddy Cool Boys Fool) is a 2013 Punjabi-language Indian film starring Amrinder Gill, Harish Verma, Ihana Dhillon, Yuvika Chaudhary, Jaswinder Bhalla, Amar Noorie and Karamjeet Anmol.
Harish Verma and Amrinder Gill were seen together for the first time in this film.

Daddy Cool Munde Fool is directed by Simerjit Singh and was released on 12 April 2013 under the banners KG Productions, Royal Ent. and Celluloid Entertainment. It is a Speed Records Home production after "Jatt and Juliet". Music of the film was given by Dr. Zeus and shooting of the movie started March onwards in India.

Plot
Widower Parminder Singh Puppy is worried about the future of his careless and spoilt sons Gunni and Manni. Both the sons falls in love with two sisters Rinki and Minki. Parminder is planning his own wedding with a widow Dilraaj Kaur Dil who was his lover during college and unknown to him, is mother of Rinki and Minki. Parminder is also unaware of their sons' love life. Parminder and his sons go to Dilraaj's house with marriage proposal, with the father unaware that his sons want to marry and sons unaware of their father's wishes. This follows a lot of chaos and drama in their lives.

Reception
Ballewood gives the movie 3/5 stars saying, "A light-hearted family entertainer with some honest performances, unpredictable storyline and situational humour, Daddy Cool Munde Fool is a joyride with comedy full on." Punjabimania gave the movie a thumping 3/5 rating stating that DCMF is one of those clean comedies, which you can enjoy with your whole family and won't be disappointed. It's not a classic but its something which if you love Punjabi Movies, you will definitely have a laugh.

At the box office Daddy Cool Munde Fool scored the fifth highest Punjabi film opening week collections at the time of release with an opening week collection of Rs 2.60 cr.

Cast 
 Amrinder Gill as Manni
 Harish Verma as Gunni
 Jaswinder Bhalla as Parminder Singh Puppy
 Sardar Sohi as Puppy's friend
 Rana Ranbir as Manjit Singh
 Upasna Singh as Preto/Rajjo
 Amar Noorie as Dilraaj Kaur 'Dil'
 Yuvika Chaudhary as Rinki
 Ihana Dhillon as Minki
 Karamjit Anmol as Golu

Soundtrack

The soundtrack album was released on 13 March 2013.

Music reception
Cine Punjab Reviews gave the music 3.5 stars and wrote that the OST of "Daddy Cool Munde Fool" will be remembered for the debut of Dr Zeus (Music Direction) and Bilal Saeed (Singing) and Jassi Gill (Singing) in Punjabi Cinema.

References

2013 films
Punjabi-language Indian films
2010s Punjabi-language films
Films directed by Simerjit Singh
Films scored by Dr Zeus